Pashaw is an extinct town in Vernon County, in the U.S. state of Missouri.

A post office called Pashaw was established in 1888, and remained in operation until 1905. The community took its name from a local nearby creek.

References

Ghost towns in Missouri
Former populated places in Vernon County, Missouri